Ma is the tenth studio album by Venezuelan-American musician Devendra Banhart. It was released on September 13, 2019 on Nonesuch Records.

Critical reception
"Ma" was met with generally favorable reviews from critics. At Metacritic, which assigns a weighted average rating out of 100 to reviews from mainstream publications, this release received an average score of 79, based on 12 reviews.

Track listing

Charts

References

2019 albums
Devendra Banhart albums
Nonesuch Records albums